Novotel Manila Araneta City, alternately named Novotel Manila Araneta Center, is a 4-Star Hotel located at the Araneta City in Quezon City, Philippines. The mid-scale, full-service hotel is part of AccorHotels, and the first hotel under the Novotel brand in the Philippines.

History
The plans for the development of a 400-room business hotel within the Araneta City was laid out as early as 2000, as part the Araneta Center Master Plan. The plans were finalized within early 2008, before announcing the launch of the hotel on July 2008. On December 2008, the Araneta Group, through Araneta Center Hotel, Inc., announced their joint venture partnership project with AccorHotels in a press conference held within Aurora Tower. After 4 years of negotiations and design changes, the hotel was officially launched in February 2012 with a ceremonial lowering of a time capsule, and presented a presentation of the hotel's features, interiors and amenities, which is touted by the Araneta Group as the “crown jewel” for the complex's redevelopment project. 

It was initially planned to open partially by the end of 2014, and was later moved on early 2015 that the hotel will start accepting guests. However, the hotel had its soft opening later in October 2015. On March 8, 2016, then-President Benigno Aquino III, along with other executives and officials, led the grand opening launch of the hotel.

Location
The hotel is located adjacent to the Araneta Coliseum, standing at the coliseum's south-eastern corner and is accessible to nearby transport hubs and railway stations such as the MRT 3 Cubao Station, the LRT 2 Cubao Station and other transport terminals. The hotel is also accessible to nearby malls and buildings within the Araneta City, such as the Gateway Mall, the SM Cubao, the Farmers Plaza, the Ali Mall, the Manhattan Gardens condominiums, the Araneta City Cyberpark towers, the New Frontier Theater, and the upcoming Gateway Mall 2 and the Ibis Styles Araneta City.

Construction and architecture
The building of Novotel Manila Araneta Center has a total of 24 floors. The Araneta Group, under Jorge L. Araneta tapped EEI Corporation as the main contractor in the construction of the hotel building. Araneta also tapped London-based architect Sudhakar Thakurdesai as the design consultant of the project, while tapping Kang Tang of Taiwan and lighting firm Lumino Design for the lighting works of the hotel. Araneta tapped Thai-firm IA49 as the interior designers of the project, while local firm PGAA Creative Design was tapped for the landscaping works of the hotel.

Features
The hotel has  of total floor area and features an urban contemporary architecture that emphasizes natural light throughout the building.

Novotel also houses a variety of amenities located within the amenity area, which includes a gym, a play area (Novotel Kids Club), a spa room (In Balance Spa). The Versailles Event Garden utilizes the rooftop of the adjacent Araneta Coliseum Parking Garage South and also includes an events tent, and archways. The hotel also features 7 meeting & function rooms, and the pillarless Monet Grand Ballroom capable of housing a total of 1,500 people. The hotel also houses the Wintz Garden, and the Premier Lounge, offering complete views of the Metro Manila skyline and the Province of Rizal.

The hotel offers 5 different restaurants, namely the Food Exchange Manila, the Gourmet Bar, the sixth Pool Bar and Lounge, Indulge Gelato, and the Sabor Bar de Vinos, owned by Araneta Group CEO Jorge L. Araneta.

Reception
The hotel's In Balance Spa was recognized as one of the five recipients in the Philippines to be awarded the ASEAN Spa Services Standard Award 2019 – 2021. The hotel's culinary team won the silver award in the Filipino Cuisine category, while Chef Mikee Villanueva won the bronze award in Fantasy Plated Dessert category at the World Food Expo, held at the SMX Convention Center Manila in Pasay.

The hotel also received recognition from Agoda and Tripadvisor, as the hotel was awarded the Agoda's 2020 Customer Review Award, and the 2020 Tripadvisor Travellers’ Choice Award, for the hotel's services based on the customer's ratings, overall quality experience and high customer reviews.

Gallery

References

Hotels in Metro Manila
Buildings and structures in Quezon City
Manila Araneta City
Hotel buildings completed in 2014
Hotels established in 2015